John Yocum Randolph Crawford (August 4, 1915 – February 14, 1976) was an American bridge and backgammon player. 

In bridge, he was a member of United States teams that won the first three Bermuda Bowls, or world  championships, in 1950, 1951 and 1953; a wholly new team represented the US in 1954. In backgammon, Crawford is known as the inventor of the "Crawford rule", a regulation that restricts use of the doubling cube in match play.

Life
Crawford was born in Bryn Mawr, Pennsylvania and died in Manhattan at age 60. He was married to Carol Crawford.

Books

 Canasta (New York: JCS Associates, 1950; London: Faber, 1951) 
 Samba, three-deck canasta (Doubleday, 1951) 
 How to be a consistent winner in the most popular card games (Doubleday, 1953); revised 1961
 Contract bridge (Grosset & Dunlap, 1953), Crawford assisted by Fred L. Karpin 
 Calypso: how to play and win the fascinating new card game (Doubleday, 1955) 
 The backgammon book (Viking Press, 1970), Oswald Jacoby and Crawford 

The latter was soon translated.
 Das Backgammonbuch, German transl. by Jens Schmidt-Prange and Suzanne Gangloff (Munich: Keyser, 1974)
 Le livre du backgammon, French transl. by René Orléan, 1975

Bridge accomplishments

Honors
 ACBL Hall of Fame, 1995

Awards
 Fishbein Trophy 1952, 1957
 Herman Trophy 1953

Wins
 Bermuda Bowl (3) 1950, 1951, 1953
 North American Bridge Championships (37)
 Vanderbilt (9) 1941, 1946, 1950, 1951, 1955, 1956, 1957, 1959, 1960
 Spingold (5) 1943, 1948, 1950, 1952, 1957
 Chicago (now Reisinger) (10) 1937, 1938, 1939, 1942, 1946, 1947, 1953, 1954, 1956, 1961
 Men's Board-a-Match Teams (2) 1956, 1961
 Master Mixed Teams (4) 1942, 1945, 1948, 1957
 Life Master Pairs (1) 1943
 Men's Pairs (1) 1939
 Rockwell Mixed Pairs (3) 1948, 1949, 1959
 Hilliard Mixed Pairs (1) 1945
 Master Individual (1) 1956

Runners-up
 Bermuda Bowl (1) 1958
 North American Bridge Championships (27)
 Vanderbilt (1) 1952
 Spingold (4) 1939, 1947, 1955, 1961
 Chicago (now Reisinger) (2) 1948, 1950
 Men's Board-a-Match Teams (4) 1946, 1948, 1959, 1973
 Master Mixed Teams (6) 1944, 1949, 1950, 1952, 1973, 1975
 Life Master Pairs (5) 1938, 1941, 1947, 1952, 1956
 Men's Pairs (1) 1953
 Rockwell Mixed Pairs (1) 1947
 Hilliard Mixed Pairs (1) 1942
 Master Individual (2) 1951, 1958

References

External links
 
 
 "John Crawford – The Table Games Genius" at Backgammon Portal (backgommoned.com)

 

1915 births
1976 deaths
American backgammon players
American contract bridge players
Bermuda Bowl players
Contract bridge writers
Sportspeople from New York City
People from Bryn Mawr, Pennsylvania
Card game book writers